Bel Air Courthouse Historic District is a national historic district at Bel Air, Harford County, Maryland, United States. It consists of a small cohesive group of buildings, mostly two or three stories of brick or frame construction that were erected or renovated in the 19th to early 20th century period and border the Harford County Courthouse which is a grand scale brick structure.

It was added to the National Register of Historic Places in 1985.

References

External links
, including photo dated 2006, at Maryland Historical Trust
Boundary Map of the Bel Air Courthouse Historic District, Harford County, at Maryland Historical Trust

Historic districts in Harford County, Maryland
Historic districts on the National Register of Historic Places in Maryland
Courthouses in Maryland
National Register of Historic Places in Harford County, Maryland
Courthouses on the National Register of Historic Places in Maryland
1985 establishments in Maryland